Marty O'Donnell may refer to:

Martin O'Donnell (born 1955), known as Marty, American composer
Marty O'Donnell (boxer) (born 1973), Canadian Olympic boxer